Nadir Baba oglu Ibrahimov (December 29, 1932 – January 1, 1977) was an Azerbaijani and a Soviet astronomer. A crater on Mars is named in his honor.

Nadir Ibragimov was astrophysicist at Shamakhi Astrophysical Observatory of the Azerbaijan National Academy of Sciences.

References 

1932 births
1977 deaths
Azerbaijani astronomers
Azerbaijani astrophysicists
Baku State University alumni
Soviet astronomers